The Marquette–Wisconsin men's basketball rivalry is an intercollegiate basketball rivalry between the Marquette Golden Eagles and Wisconsin Badgers. The rivalry series is between the two major college athletics programs in the state of Wisconsin and is known as the I-94 rivalry, given the 78 miles along the highway separating the two schools. The game was ranked the 16th-best among college basketball programs in 2013 and 13th in 2020. The series is the second most-played for the Golden Eagles, only trailing its series with DePaul. In turn, Marquette is Wisconsin's most-played non-conference opponent. Marquette and Wisconsin have met 124 times and has been played annually since 1958.  As of 2020, the series is led by Wisconsin, which holds a 68–58 advantage. Since the 1949–50 season, the total point differential has only been 48, signifying the relative competitiveness of the series.

Series history 
Under head coach Al McGuire, Marquette dominated the 1970s as the program became a national powerhouse, including a series-record 15 straight victories from 1969 to 1978 that inflamed tensions to their then-high. During the stretch, Marquette was ranked in the Top 12 for all but one year, while the Badgers entered unranked each season. One of the most memorable games occurred in 1974, as the Golden Eagles' Maurice Lucas hit a 20-foot jumpshot as time expired to lift Marquette to a 59–58 victory. In celebration, McGuire jumped onto the scorer's table and raised his fists as Badgers coach John Powless walks away dejectedly. The moment was captured in a famous photograph by Robert "Buck" Miller.

Wisconsin finally snapped the streak in 1978 after McGuire retired, flipping the narrative on the series after a 65 to 52 victory. Coming into the game, Marquette had won 25 of the last 40 matchups; since, the Badgers have compiled a 25–19 record. In the most recent meeting, Marquette won in tip-in buzzer beater fashion to beat Wisconsin 67-65 and win 3 of the last 4 meetings.

Rival accomplishments 
The following summarizes the accomplishments of the two programs.

Game results

References 

College basketball rivalries in the United States
Marquette Golden Eagles men's basketball
Wisconsin Badgers men's basketball